Aurelia is a genus of scyphozoan jellyfish, commonly called moon jellies. There are currently 25 accepted species and many that are still not formally described.

The genus was first described in 1816 by Jean-Baptiste Lamarck in his book Histoire Naturelle des Animaux sans Vertèbres (Natural History of Invertebrates). It has been suggested that Aurelia is the best-studied group of gelatinous zooplankton, with Aurelia aurita the best-studied species in the genus; two other species, Aurelia labiata and Aurelia limbata were also traditionally investigated throughout the 20th century. In the early 2000s, studies that considered genetic data showed that diversity in Aurelia was higher than expected based solely on morphology, so one cannot confidently attribute the results from most of the previous studies to the species named. More recently, studies have highlighted the morphological variability (including the potential for phenotypic plasticity) in this genus, emphasizing the difficulty of identifying cryptic species.

Species of Aurelia can be found in the Atlantic, Arctic, Pacific and Indian Oceans, and seem to be more common in temperate regions, such as in the waters off northern China, Japan, Korea, New Zealand, the northeastern and northwestern coasts of the United States as well as the northern Europe.

Aurelia undergoes alternation of generations, whereby the sexually-reproducing pelagic medusa stage is either male or female, and the benthic polyp stage reproduces asexually. Meanwhile, life cycle reversal, in which polyps are formed directly from juvenile and sexually mature medusae or their fragments, was also observed in Aurelia coerulea (= Aurelia sp. 1).

Appearance 
The similar appearances of moon jellyfish is what has made them so hard to identify. The adult medusae are typically translucent in color but the color of their gut can change based on what they eat; for example, if they eat crustaceans, they can have a pink or lavender tint to them and if they were to eat brine shrimp, the tint would be more of an orange color. Their polyps usually have around 16 tentacles (although Aurelia insularia has 27-33 tentacles)  which mostly help with feeding.

Feeding 

The diet of Aurelia is similar to that of other jellyfish. They primarily feed on zooplankton. They may prey on or compete with commercially important fish and their larvae, as well as cause several issues for trawling boats when large aggregations occur, as they may clog and damage fishing nets as well as force fisherman to relocate.

Characteristics 
They are able to sense light and dark and up and down due to rhopalia around the bell margin. After many tests on frogs, it was determined that A. aurita has a proteinaceous venom that causes muscle twitching by inducing the irreversible depolarization of the muscle membrane that is believed to be caused by an increase in the membrane’s permeability to sodium ions.

Reproduction 

The medusa stage of the jellyfish reproduce sexually. The males release strings of sperm and the females ingest them. Once the ciliated larvae develop from the egg, they settle on or near the sea floor and develop into benthic polyps. The polyps then reproduce asexually and bud into ephyrae which later turn into medusae.

See also 
 Gelatinous zooplankton

References

External links 

Photos of Aurelia in Norway
Aurelia in Bermuda
Animal Diversity Web: Aurelia aurita
Tree of Life: Aurelia aurita life cycle
World Register of Marine Species: Aurelia aurita
Scyphozoan Jellyfish

 
Scyphozoan genera
Cnidarians of the Atlantic Ocean
Cnidarians of the Pacific Ocean
Ulmaridae